Michael Thomas Gorman (born November 24, 1945) is an American television play-by-play commentator for the Boston Celtics on NBC Sports Boston. Gorman also did play-by-play, alongside Fran Fraschilla, for NBC for basketball games during the 2016 Summer Olympics. Gorman was a recipient of the 2021 Curt Gowdy Award and was inducted into the media wing of the Basketball Hall of Fame as part of a star-studded 2021 class that included one of Gorman's favorite players in Paul Pierce.

Career
An aviator for the United States Navy (1970–1975), Gorman began his broadcasting career at WNBH in New Bedford and WPRO in Providence. There, he also served as sports director at WPRI, as the voice of the University of Rhode Island on WPRO, and as television play-by-play commentator for the Providence College.

In the 1980s, Gorman was the primary announcer for ESPN's "Big Monday" Big East Game of the Week. He has called the NCAA basketball tournament on CBS; tennis at the 1992 Barcelona Summer Olympics with Bud Collins on NBC; the NBA Playoffs on TBS, Handball at the 2012 Summer Olympics in London, and Men's Basketball at the 2016 Summer Olympics in Rio de Janeiro.

Gorman and color commentator Tom Heinsohn formed one of the longest-tenured broadcast tandems in professional sports. The partnership lasted for 39 years, from 1981 until Heinsohn's death in November 2020.

A five-time Emmy award winner, Gorman was inducted into the New England Basketball Hall of Fame in 2004 and the National Basketball Hall of Fame in 2021.

References

External links

NBA profile
NBC Sports profile

1945 births
Living people
People from Dorchester, Massachusetts
Boston Latin School alumni
Boston State College alumni
United States Naval Aviators
Tennis commentators
College basketball announcers in the United States
College football announcers
National Basketball Association broadcasters
Women's National Basketball Association announcers
Boston Celtics personnel
Boston Celtics announcers
Olympic Games broadcasters
Sports Emmy Award winners
Military personnel from Massachusetts